Walter I Grenier (or Walter of Caesarea) (died 1154) was the Lord of Caesarea in the Kingdom of Jerusalem, succeeding his father Eustace (died  1123). He was the twin brother of Gerard Grenier, Lord of Sidon (sometimes known as Eustace II). He was a member of the House of Grenier.

According to William of Tyre, Walter was "of fine appearance and famous for his strength." His mother Emelota remarried Hugh II of Le Puiset, a cousin of Queen Melisende, whose relationship with the queen was suspected of being "too familiar." Walter, prompted by Melisende's husband King Fulk, accused his stepfather of treason before the Haute Cour. Hugh denied the charge and it was decreed that the dispute should be settled by judicial combat, but Hugh did not show up on the appointed day; instead, he allied with the Muslim garrison at Ascalon and led a rebellion against Fulk. He was later sentenced to exile.

In 1148 Walter was present at the Council of Acre, where the nobility of Jerusalem met Louis VII of France and Conrad III of Germany and other European magnates who had arrived on the Second Crusade.

Walter married a woman named Juliane, and was succeeded by his son Hugh as lord of Caesarea.

Sources
William of Tyre, A History of Deeds Done Beyond the Sea, Volume II. Trans. Emily Atwater Babcock and A. C. Krey. Columbia University Press, 1943.

1154 deaths
Christians of the Crusades
Walter
Year of birth unknown